Job security is the probability that an individual will keep their job; a job with a high level of security is such that a person with the job would have a small chance of losing it. Many factors threaten job security: globalization, outsourcing, downsizing, recession, and new technology, to name a few.

Basic economic theory holds that during periods of economic expansion businesses experience increased demand, which in turn necessitates investment in more capital or labor. When businesses are experiencing growth, job confidence and security typically increase. The opposite often holds true during a recession: businesses experience reduced demand and look to downsize their workforces in the short term.

Governments and individuals are both motivated to achieve higher levels of job security. Governments attempt to do this by passing laws (such as the U.S. Civil Rights Act of 1964) which make it illegal to fire employees for certain reasons. Individuals can influence their degree of job security by increasing their skills through education and experience, or by moving to a more favorable location. The official unemployment rate and employee confidence indexes are good indicators of job security in particular fields. These statistics are closely watched by economists, government officials, and banks.

Unions also strongly influence job security. Jobs that traditionally have a strong union presence such as many government jobs and jobs in education, healthcare and law enforcement are considered very secure while many non-unionized private sector jobs are generally believed to offer lower job security, although this varies by industry and country.

Measuring job security
This is a list of countries by job security, an important component in measuring quality of life and the well-being of its citizens. It lists OECD countries' workers' chance of losing their job in 2012, with some non-OECD countries also included. Workers facing a high risk of job loss are more vulnerable, especially in countries with smaller social safety nets . This indicator presents the probability to become unemployed, calculated as the number of people who were unemployed in 2012, but were employed in 2011 over the total number of employed in 2011.

In the United States
While all economies are impacted by market forces (which change the supply and demand of labor) the United States is particularly susceptible to these forces due to a long history of fiscal conservatism and minimal government intervention.

Minimal government intervention has helped the United States create an at-will employment system that applies across many industries. Consequently, with limited exceptions, an employee's job security closely follows an employer's demand for their skills. For example, in the aftermath of the dot com boom of 1997–2000, employees in the technology industry experienced a massive drop in job security and confidence. More recently, in 2009 many manufacturing workers experienced a similar drop in job security and confidence.  Closely following market forces also means that employment in the United States rebounds when industries adjust to new economic realities. For example, employee confidence and job security in both manufacturing and technology have rebounded substantially.

In the United States job insecurity is higher for men than women, with workers aged 30–64 experiencing more insecurity when compared with other age groups. Divorced or separated workers, and workers with less than a high school diploma also report higher job insecurity. Overall, workers in the construction industry have the highest rate of job insecurity at 55%.

The impact of unemployment and job insecurity on both mental and physical health is now the subject of a growing body of research. This will offer insights into why, for example, an increasing number of men in the United States are not returning to work. In 1960, only 5% of men ages 30–35 were unemployed whereas roughly 13% were unemployed in 2006. The New York Times attributes a large portion of this to blue collar and professional men refusing to work in jobs that they are overqualified for or do not provide adequate benefits in contrast to their previous jobs. It could also be attributed to a mismatch between the skills employees currently have, and the skills employers in traditionally male dominated industries (such as manufacturing) are looking for.

According to data from 2014 employee confidence reports, 50% of all current workers 18 and over feel confident in their ability to find a new job if necessary, and 60% are confident in the future of their employer. Job insecurity, defined as being worried about becoming unemployed, is a concern to 25% of U.S. workers.

Outsourcing

Overseas outsourcing (sometimes called offshoring) may decrease job security for people in certain occupations such as telemarketers, computer programmers, medical transcriptionists, and bookkeeping clerks. Generally, to outsource work to a different country the job must be quick to learn and the completed work must be transferable with minimal loss of quality.

In Europe
The main difference vis-à-vis the United States is the system of indefinite contracts. In most European countries many employees have indefinite contracts which, whilst not guaranteeing a job for life, make it very difficult for the employer to terminate a contract. Employees who have legally acquired these rights, for example because they have been with a company for two years continuously, can only be dismissed for disciplinary reasons (after a number of formal warnings and subject to independent appeal) or in the case of a company undergoing restructuring (subject to generous laws on redundancy payments and often with retraining paid for by the company). In Spain, for example, such employees are entitled to 45 days redundancy pay per year worked. The high cost of redundancy payments is in practice what gives employees job security.

Whilst employees who have such legally binding, indefinite contracts are in the enviable position of knowing that they (and their family) have complete financial security for the rest of their lives, it is important to realise that these obligations work both ways. In some countries such as Germany a company may prevent an employee (whose occupational training they have paid for) from leaving to take up a better post elsewhere until compensation is agreed. An employee of a company about to fold may feel compelled to stay with the company, even if they are offered work with a different firm.

Every company will have a mix of employees on different types of contract. Indefinite contracts can also exist for seasonal work. These so-called discontinuous contracts mean that a hotel, for example, may dismiss its staff in the autumn, but it must take the same people back on again the following spring.

The proportion of the workforce on indefinite contracts has fallen across Europe in response to increased competition and globalization. Companies may dismiss an employee just before they reach the two-year mark and then re-hire them as a new employee. Many economists argue that greater labour market flexibility is necessary.  Economics professors argue that the threat of unemployment is necessary to maintain incentives to high productivity. Meanwhile, John Kenneth Galbraith has argued in The Affluent Society that some established economics professors simultaneously seek tenure. Jobs that are not backed by an indefinite contract are still poorly regarded in many European societies, often disparagingly described as "precarious" or "McJobs"—even when the company has good prospects.

In less regulated European economies, such as the United Kingdom, it is much cheaper to sack permanent employees. In Britain, employees are only entitled to a legal minimum of one week's redundancy pay per year worked (one and a half weeks for workers over 40 years old). Instead, private- and public-sector employees who feel they have been unfairly dismissed have the right to take the company to an Employment Tribunal in order to be re-instated or to obtain extra compensation. It is not necessary to go through the normal court system.

In Sweden, employment contracts can be time-limited, and can be extended for new time-limited periods, or not, without reason. This is only allowed for the first two years of employment.  At expiration the employee will stand without job and without compensation if no extension takes place. Once with an indefinite contract the employer may only lay off people for strong valid reason. One reason could be for the employer needing less workers. In that case the general law is the person who hold their employment the longest are the last when losing their job.

In all European Union countries an employee retains their existing contractual rights if their company is taken over under the Acquired Rights Directive (in the UK, known as TUPE) so the years spent working for the old company would count when calculating redundancy payments, etc.

In India
In India job security is high as Indian labour law make firing difficult for permanent employees. Most Indians work till retirement in the same company apart from workers in some sectors such as technology. Due to large population, competition is high but so is the size of the job market.

See also

Dismissal
First Employment Contract (a French contract that provoked massive protests before being finally repealed)
Contingent work
Flexicurity
Full employment
Job guarantee
Permatemp
McJob

References

External links
Outline of U.S. Economy

Employment
Occupations